"Late Last Night" was a single originally recorded by New Zealand band Split Enz in Australia in 1976. Written by Phil Judd, it was accompanied by the band's first promotional video clip. The single was a minor hit on the Australian Top 100, reaching number 93.

The song was re-recorded in London later the same year for the album Second Thoughts.

Track listings

Australia/New Zealand release 
"Late Last Night" 4:06
"Time for a Change" (live) 4:05

Netherlands release 
"Late Last Night" (re-recording) 4:06
"Titus" 3:14

Personnel
 Tim Finn - vocals
 Phil Judd - vocals, guitars, mandolin
 Mike Chunn - bass
 Noel Crombie - percussion
 Emlyn Crowther - drums
 Robert Gillies - saxophone, trumpet
 Eddie Rayner - keyboards

Charts

References 

Split Enz songs
1976 singles
Songs written by Phil Judd